FC Spartak Rybnoye was an association football team from Rybnoye, Ryazan Oblast, Russia. It played professionally for one season in 1997 in the Russian Third League. It was excluded from the league after playing eighteen games.

External links
 Team history at KLISF

Association football clubs established in 1997
Association football clubs disestablished in 1997
Defunct football clubs in Russia
Sport in Ryazan Oblast
1997 establishments in Russia
1997 disestablishments in Russia